The 1996 Torneo Grandes de Centroamérica was the 15th UNCAF Club Tournament and the first one since 1984; the tournament was renamed Torneo Grandes de Centroamérica.  Costa Rican side Liga Deportiva Alajuelense were crowned champions.

Teams

Original format
Originally 2 groups of 4 teams were organized, however, Hondurans Motagua and Olimpia withdrew and they were scrapped from the groups. The day before the start, Atlético Marte also withdrew leaving the groups uneven; the draw was revised and all teams played each other in a home and away format.

Standings

Results

References

1996
1
1995–96 in Honduran football
1995–96 in Salvadoran football
1995–96 in Guatemalan football
1995–96 in Costa Rican football